Stergios Psianos (born 12 September 1989) is a Greek professional footballer who plays as a midfielder for Kozani.

Career
Psianos signed a contract with Cypriot club Nea Salamina on July 4, 2013 and made his debut on September 1, 2013 at the 2-0 away loss against Doxa Katokopias.

References

External links

1989 births
Living people
Greek footballers
Greece youth international footballers
Association football defenders
Football League (Greece) players
Cypriot First Division players
Apollon Pontou FC players
Ethnikos Piraeus F.C. players
Thrasyvoulos F.C. players
Niki Volos F.C. players
Kozani F.C. players
Nea Salamis Famagusta FC players
Greek expatriate footballers
Expatriate footballers in Cyprus
Footballers from Kozani